Evere railway station is a railway station in Brussels, Belgium, in the municipality of Evere. The station opened on 19 July 1926 and is located under street level, and can be accessed via the Rue Auguste De Boeck/Auguste De Boeckstraat. The station lies on line 26 between the stations of Bordet and Meiser.

Train services
The station is served by the following service(s):

Brussels RER services (S4) Vilvoorde - Merode - Etterbeek - Brussels-Luxembourg - Denderleeuw - Aalst (weekdays, peak hours only)
Brussels RER services (S5) Mechelen - Brussels-Luxembourg - Etterbeek - Halle - Enghien (- Geraardsbergen) (weekdays)
Brussels RER services (S7) Mechelen - Merode - Halle (weekdays)
Brussels RER services (S9) Leuven - Brussels-Luxembourg - Etterbeek - Braine-l'Alleud (weekdays, peak hours only)

References

Railway stations in Brussels
Evere
Railway stations opened in 1926